Reduvius is a large genus of reduviids or assassin bugs. The masked hunter, Reduvius personatus, is a well-known example of this genus.

They measure 8–22 mm. They are the largest predatory insects and one of the largest clades of predatory insects. They are found in many terrestrial ecosystems and microhabitats, ranging from mammal burrows in the desert to logs in rainforests.

Partial list of species
Reduvius fedtschenkianus (Oshanin, 1871) 
Reduvius jakovleffi Reuter, 1892
Reduvius pallipes Klug, 1830
Reduvius personatus (Linnaeus, 1758) "Masked hunter"
Reduvius senilis Van Duzee, 1906 
Reduvius sonoraensis Usinger, 1942 
Reduvius testaceus Herrich-Schaeffer, 1845
Reduvius vanduzeei Wygodzinsky & Usinger, 1964

References

Reduviidae